Kanaka Creek Regional Park is a regional park of the Greater Vancouver Regional District, located in the city of Maple Ridge, British Columbia, flanking both sides of Kanaka Creek from its confluence with the Fraser River just east of Haney and extending approximately 11 km (7 mi) up the creek to just south of the community of Webster's Corners.  

The 400 ha. park has three main areas. The Riverfront area adjacent to the Fraser and BC Hwy 7 has picnic tables and a boat-launch, suitable for launching canoes and kayaks for navigating the slow-moving waters of Kanaka Creek up as far as the 240th Street bridge. The Riverfront Trail winds along this stretch of the creek and has a number of three-story wooden viewing towers. Above 240th Street the stream is shallower and full of snags and not suitable for boating. Above that a popular swimming hole with slickrock slides is at Cliff Falls. There are twin falls on Kanaka Creek, one on each of its upper fork. Much of the upper area of the park is heavily forested, though hiking along the creek beds is feasible and a number of wooden walkways through the forest and along the creek have been established in the area.

The Maple Ridge Fairgrounds are just east of the lower regions of the park, beyond them is the community of Albion. Derby Reach Regional Park is just across the Fraser in Langley

See also
Kanaka Creek, British Columbia (community adjacent to lower reaches)
List of protected areas in British Columbia

References
Kanaka Creek Regional Park, Blue Mountain Forest page

Information and pictures, District of Maple Ridge website

External links
Trail Map (Metro Vancouver regional parks website)
Photo Gallery, www.greatervancouverparks.com

Maple Ridge, British Columbia
Parks in Greater Vancouver
Waterfalls of British Columbia